Eakly is a town in Caddo County, Oklahoma, United States. The population was 338 at the 2010 census.

History
A post office was established in the community of Eakly in March 1902, while this area was still part of Oklahoma Territory. Apparently, a plat was not filed for the town until the 1920s, which meant that town lots could not be sold during the first two decades of Eakly's formal existence. Two organizations were exempted from this limit: the Methodist church bought a building site in 1914, and the Bank of Eakly bought a site in 1920. All others who wished to build in the town had to lease the land.

Eakly's first census was in 1940, showing 231 residents. The population dropped somewhat during World War II, and registered 191 in 1950, probably because people moved to military service and war production work in larger towns and cities. There was an upswing in 1960 and 1970, which peaked at 452 by 1980. The count dropped to 277 in 1990, and has never again approached the 1980 high.

The lack of a registered town plat and the lack of a railroad did not prevent Eakly from prospering as an agricultural center. Cotton farming was the main activity in early decades. After World War II, irrigation began to spread into this part of Oklahoma, enabling more diverse crops. Peanut farming became the leading agricultural activity in the 1960s. The community incorporated as a town in 1957. A house manufacturing plant was built in 1970, but soon went out of business.

The closing was attributed to a 1990 state educational reform law that promised financial incentives to small school districts that agreed to consolidate. The surviving district in this case will be known as the Hydro-Eakly District

Geography
Eakly is located in northwestern Caddo County at  (35.303547, -98.555436).

Eakly is less than 19 miles from Fort Cobb State Park on Fort Cobb Reservoir.

Demographics

As of the census of 2010, there were 338 people living in the town. There were 140 housing units at an average density of 543 per square mile (213/km2). The racial makeup of the town was 80.07% White, 4.71% Native American, 14.13% from other races, and 1.09% from two or more races. Hispanic or Latino of any race were 13.77% of the population.

There were 119 households in the town, out of which 25.9% had children under the age of 18 living with them, 58.0% were married couples living together, 10.7% had a female householder with no husband present, and 26.8% were non-families. 23.2% of all households were made up of individuals, and 14.3% had someone living alone who was 65 years of age or older. The average household size was 2.46 and the average family size was 2.87.

In the town, the population was spread out, with 23.2% under the age of 18, 11.2% from 18 to 24, 20.3% from 25 to 44, 26.4% from 45 to 64, and 18.8% who were 65 years of age or older. The median age was 41 years. For every 100 females, there were 90.3 males. For every 100 females age 18 and over, there were 94.5 males.

The median income for a household in the town was $27,500, and the median income for a family was $32,000. Males had a median income of $22,500 versus $15,000 for females. The per capita income for the town was $15,383. About 12.8% of families and 15.3% of the population were below the poverty line, including 18.2% of those under the age of eighteen and 18.4% of those 65 or over.

Notable people
Mike Moore, baseball player

References

External links
 Encyclopedia of Oklahoma History and Culture - Eakly

Towns in Caddo County, Oklahoma
Towns in Oklahoma
Populated places established in 1902